Anton Webern's Concerto for Nine Instruments, Op. 24 (German: Konzert für neun Instrumente), written in 1934, is a twelve-tone concerto for nine instruments: flute, oboe, clarinet, horn, trumpet, trombone, violin, viola, and piano. It consists of three movements:

The concerto is based on a derived row, "often cited [such as by Milton Babbitt (1972)] as a paragon of symmetrical construction". The tone row is shown below.

In the words of Luigi Dallapiccola, the concerto is "a work of incredible conciseness... and of unique concentration... . Although I did not understand the work completely, I had the feeling of finding an aesthetic and stylistic unity as great as I could wish for. [Prague, September 5, 1935]".

The second movement "limits quite severely the values of many domains," for example featuring "only two durational values (quarter and half note[s])," and, partly as a result, "features great uniformity in texture and gesture".

The tone row may be interpreted as: 019, 2te, 367, 458.

The opening displays "[the Concerto's] distinctive trichordal structuring," four of which "comprise an aggregate," or partition. "The six combinations of [the partition's] trichords generate three pairs of complementary hexachords". "Webern takes full advantage of this property [its fourfold degree of symmetry] in the Concerto," that under four appropriate transformations (T0T6I5IB), the tone row maintains its unordered trichords (j=019,091,etc., k=2te, l=367, and m=458). The hexachord featured is sometimes called the 'Ode-to-Napoleon' hexachord (014589).

According to Brian Alegant, "[t]he Latin square... clearly shows the built in redundancy of [the] partition," four, and, "needless to say, Webern takes full advantage of this property in the Concerto":

{| class="wikitable" border="1"

|-
|  j
|  k
|  l
|  m
|-
|  l
|  m
|  j
|  k
|-
|  m
|  l
|  k
|  j
|-
|  k
|  j
|  m
|  l
|}

For example, I5 = 548, 376, 2et, 109.

Sources

Further reading
Gauldin, Robert (1977). "Pitch Structure in the Second Movement of Webern's Concerto Op. 24.", In Theory Only 2, no. 10: 8–22. Cited on p. 38 of Brian Alegant, "Cross-Partitions as Harmony and Voice Leading in Twelve-Tone Music", Music Theory Spectrum 23, no. 1 (Spring 2001), pp. 1–40.
Gauldin, Robert (1977). "The Magic Squares of the Third Movement of Webern's Concerto Op. 24." In Theory Only 2, nos. 11–12:32–42. Cited on p, 38 of Alegant 2001.
Hartwell, Robin (1979). "Rhythmic Organisation in the Serial Music of Anton Webern". PhD diss. Brighton: University of Sussex.
Rahn, John (1980). Basic Atonal Theory. New York: Longman, Inc. .
Stockhausen, Karlheinz (1963 [1953]). "Weberns Konzert für neun Instrumente op. 24". In his Texte zur Musik 1, edited by Dieter Schnebel, 24–31. DuMont Dokumente. Cologne: Verlag M. DuMont Schauberg. [First published in Melos, no. 20 (1953), 343–348.]
Straus, Joseph N. (2011). "Contextual-Inversion Spaces". Journal of Music Theory 55, no. 1 (Spring): 43–88.
Wintle, Christopher (1982). "Analysis and Performance: Webern's Concerto Op. 24/ii.", Music Analysis 1:73–100. Cited on p. 39 of Alegant 2001; on p. 19 of Jonathan Dunsby, "Guest Editorial: Performance and Analysis of Music", Music Analysis 8, nos. 1–2 (March–July 1989): 5–20; on pp. 74–75 of Catherine Nolan, "Structural Levels and Twelve-Tone Music: A Revisionist Analysis of the Second Movement of Webern's 'Piano Variations' Op. 27", Journal of Music Theory 39, no. 1 (Spring 1995): 47–76; on pp. 324, 328, and 339 of John Rink, "Musical Structure and Performance by Wallace Berry" (review), Music Analysis 9, no. 3 (October 1990), 319–339; on pp. 57 and 88 of Straus 2011; and on pp. 337 and 353 of Whittall 1987.
Whittall, Arnold (1987). "Webern and Multiple Meaning". Music Analysis 6, no. 3 (October): 333–353.

External links

Compositions by Anton Webern
Webern
Twelve-tone compositions
1934 compositions